The 1937 North Dorset by-election was a parliamentary by-election for the British House of Commons constituency of North Dorset on 13 July 1937.

Vacancy
The by-election was caused by the death of the sitting Conservative MP, Sir Cecil Hanbury, on 10 June 1937. He had been MP here since gaining the seat in 1924.

Electoral history
The constituency had been won by the Conservatives at every election since they gained it from the Liberals in 1924. The result had always been close between the two parties since the Liberals won comfortably in 1906. The Labour party had only twice before fought the seat, in 1929 and at the last election in 1935. At that election, an Independent 'Agriculture' candidate from a longstanding local Conservative family pushed Labour into fourth place.

Candidates
The Conservative candidate was 54-year-old Captain Angus Hambro. He was Member of Parliament for South Dorset from 1910 to 1922. He became High Sheriff of Dorset in 1934.

The Liberal candidate was 58-year-old the Hon. William Borthwick, who was standing here for the fourth time having contested the General Elections of 1929, 1931 and 1935. He had been an army captain before practising as a barrister. Borthwick was described by a party colleague as "an excellent and able man, but a weak candidate."

Campaign
Polling Day was set for 13 July 1937, 33 days after the death of the previous member.

On 30 June, the Liberal campaign received early encouragement when it was announced that the party had narrowly won the 1937 St Ives by-election.

Nominations closed on 5 July. This time there was no Labour or Independent candidates.

Result
Once again, the Conservatives narrowly won the seat.

Aftermath
Hambro did not contest the seat again, choosing to retire at the 1945 general election when his successor was defeated by a new Liberal candidate. Borthwick also did not contest another election.

See also
 List of United Kingdom by-elections
 United Kingdom by-election records

References

By-elections to the Parliament of the United Kingdom in Dorset constituencies
1937 elections in the United Kingdom
1937 in England
20th century in Dorset